Burroughs Creek is a stream in St. Louis County in the U.S. state of Missouri.

Burroughs Creek is named after John Burroughs (1837–1921), an American naturalist and nature essayist.

References

Rivers of Missouri
Rivers of St. Louis County, Missouri